International trips made by the heads of state and heads of government to the United States have become a valuable part of American diplomacy and international relations since such trips were first made in the mid-19th century. They are complicated undertakings that often require months of planning along with a great deal of coordination and communication.

First visits by continent
The first international visit to the United States was made by King Kalakaua of Hawaii in 1874, which was the first visit by a foreign chief of state or head of government.

The first South American head of state to visit the United States was Emperor Pedro II of Brazil in 1876.

The first North American head of state to visit the United States was President Justo Rufino Barrios of Guatemala in 1882.

The first European head of state to visit the United States was Albert I, Prince of Monaco in 1913.

The first Asian head of state to visit the United States was King Prajadhipok of Siam in 1931.

The first African head of state to visit the United States was President Edwin Barclay of Liberia in 1943.

Visits by continent
 List of diplomatic visits to the United States: Africa
 List of diplomatic visits to the United States: Asia
 List of diplomatic visits to the United States: Europe
 List of diplomatic visits to the United States: North America and the Caribbean
 List of diplomatic visits to the United States: South America
 List of diplomatic visits to the United States: Oceania

See also
Foreign policy of the United States
Foreign relations of the United States
List of international trips made by presidents of the United States
State visit

References

External links
 Visits by Foreign Leaders – Office of the Historian (United States Department of State)

Heads of state and government visits to the United States
United States
Heads of state and government visits to the United States, List of